Anthemurgus passiflorae (the passionflower bee) is a small (7.5-8.5 mm long), black, bee that occurs from central Texas to North Carolina and north to Illinois. Females of this solitary bee use collected nectar and pollen to feed larvae located in nests constructed in the ground (through mass provisioning).  This uncommon bee is unusual for two reasons: first, the only known pollen host is a single species—the yellow passionflower (Passiflora lutea) (such specialization is called oligolecty); second, because of its size and foraging habits, the passionflower bee is thought to contribute little or nothing toward the pollination of its host plant. Female bees remove pollen from P. lutea by suspending themselves under an anther and scraping the pollen out with open mandibles. This unique position of pollen collection almost never results in pollination as the female bee rarely touches the stigma. The genus Anthemurgus contains only the passionflower bee and thus is a monotypic taxon, though some recent authorities treat Anthemurgus as a monotypic subgenus within the genus Pseudopanurgus (e.g.).

References

External links
Schappert, Phil. The passionflower bee in the Lost Pines. Lost Pines Nature Notes, Number 57.
Johnson, Stephen R. 1997. Passionate companions. The American Gardener.

Andrenidae
Insects of the United States

Monotypic bee genera